Bih or BIH may refer to:
Bosnia and Herzegovina, ISO 3166-1 alpha-3 country code BIH
Benign intracranial hypertension, a neurological disorder
Bounding interval hierarchy, a data structure for computer graphics
Bureau International de l'Heure (International Time Bureau)
An abbreviated slang form of the word "bitch"

Languages
Rade language of Vietnam (Glottolog code: bih) 
Bihari language of India and Nepal (ISO 639 alpha-3 language code bih)

Transport
Eastern Sierra Regional Airport, California (IATA location identifier) 
British International Helicopters, an airline based in England